Gamini Waleboda (born 28 October 1967) is a Sri Lankan politician and Member of Parliament.

Waleboda was born on 28 October 1967. He has bachelor and postgraduate degrees from the University of Colombo. He was served on the Board of Investment of Sri Lanka and worked for the Inland Revenue Department where he was deputy commissioner. He has been an external lecturer at several universities. He is a member of the National Freedom Front.

Waleboda contested the 2020 parliamentary election as a Sri Lanka People's Freedom Alliance electoral alliance candidate in Ratnapura District and was elected to the Parliament of Sri Lanka.

References

1967 births
Alumni of the University of Colombo
Jathika Nidahas Peramuna politicians
Living people
Members of the 16th Parliament of Sri Lanka
Sinhalese academics
Sinhalese politicians
Sri Lankan Buddhists
Sri Lanka People's Freedom Alliance politicians